Inishtooskert (sometimes spelled Inishtooshkert) (Inis Tuaisceart in Irish) is the northernmost of the Blasket Islands, County Kerry, Ireland.

Etymology 
The Irish name means "northern island" and the English name is a phonetic spelling of the Irish name. The island is also known as An Fear Marbh (the dead man) or the sleeping giant due to its appearance when seen from the east (as in the photograph).

Nature 
Inishtooskert holds important seabird colonies, as well as extensive ruins of ancient stone buildings.

Of particular note is the colony of European storm-petrels. With over 27,000 pairs in 2000 (Seabird 2000 survey), this is the largest colony in Ireland.

In culture 
The island appears frequently in David Lean's 1970 film Ryan's Daughter.

Photo gallery

See also 
 Spanish Armada in Ireland

References

External links 

 Inishtooskert entry on www.earlychristianireland.net

Blasket Islands
Uninhabited islands of Ireland
National Monuments in County Kerry
Marilyns of Ireland
Islands of County Kerry